Presidential elections were held in Chile in 1886. Carried out through a system of electors, they resulted in the election of José Manuel Balmaceda as President.

Results

References

Presidential elections in Chile
Chile
1886 in Chile
Election and referendum articles with incomplete results